Sambara is a village and panchayat in Makkuva mandal of Vizianagaram district in Andhra Pradesh, India.

Sambara Polamma Jatara is an annual festival attended by large number of people from the surrounding areas. It is second biggest Jatara in Vizianagaram district after Shri Pydithalli Ammavari Jatara in Vizianagaram city.

Demographics
 census of India, the demographic details of this village is as follows:
 Total Population: 	3,904 in 895 Households.
 Male Population: 	1,987
 Female Population: 	1,917
 Children Under 6-years of age: 524 (Boys - 271 and Girls - 253)
 Total Literates: 	1,734

References

Villages in Vizianagaram district